Rinderbach is a small river of Bavaria, Germany. It is a left tributary of the Lohr near Frammersbach.

See also
List of rivers of Bavaria

Rivers of Bavaria
Rivers of Germany